Shangyunqiao Town is an urban town in You County, Zhuzhou City, Hunan Province, People's Republic of China.

Cityscape
The town is divided into 10 villages and 5 community, the following areas: Qiliping Community, Wu'ao Community, Houshi Community, Songjiazhou Community, Gaoling Community, Gaochetou Village, Shangyunqiao Village, Fengjia'ao Village, Taiqingtang Village, Gao'an Village, Houlian Village, Zhenjiang Village, Dawu Village, Shalingbei Village, and Tianfu Village.

References

Historic township-level divisions of You County